Maclaren is a manufacturer of baby buggies, strollers and carriers based in Norwalk, Connecticut.

Product range
Strollers based around Owen Maclaren's original design are sold in over 50 countries under the Maclaren brand. These include the Maclaren Volo, Globetrotter, Triumph, Quest, Techno XT, and Techno XLR.

Financial difficulties
In September 2000, the company went into receivership with large debts and was subsequently acquired by a family based in Monaco and Switzerland. The factory in Long Buckby closed in October 2000, and production was moved to Shenzhen, China.

On 29 December 2011, the U.S. unit of Maclaren filed for Chapter 7 Liquidation, but the company is considered one of the biggest players in this industry.

Recall of strollers
In November 2009, Maclaren USA voluntarily recalled its entire line of stroller sold in the U.S. and produced from 1999-2009, comprising about one million units, citing 12 reported fingertip amputations in its hinges. The company providing free hinge covers for all consumers and advised against using the buggies until the hinge covers are installed. In May 2011, the company re-announced the recall after additional injuries had been reported.

References

Companies based in Northamptonshire
Babycare
Manufacturing companies of the United Kingdom
Baby products